Hartashen is a village in the Ashotsk Municipality of the Shirak Province of Armenia.

Demographics
The population of the village since 1873 is as follows:

References

External links 
 
 

Populated places in Shirak Province